Rostanga aliusrubens is a species of sea slug, a dorid nudibranch, a marine gastropod mollusc in the family Discodorididae.

Distribution
This species was described from Darwin, Northern Territory, Australia.

Description
This dorid nudibranch is red and the dorsum is covered with caryophyllidia; it is very similar to other species of Rostanga.

EcologyRostanga aliusrubens is found on the red sponge, Clathria lendenfeldi (family Microcionidae) on which it presumably feeds. Most other species of Rostanga'' also feed on sponges of the family Microcionidae.

References

Discodorididae
Gastropods described in 1989